Frederick W. Hinitt was the 4th president of Washington & Jefferson College.

Hinitt was born on November 21, 1866, in Kidderminster, England, and his emigrated to the United States when he was young. In 1889, he graduated with distinction from Westminster College and from McCormick Theological Seminary in 1892. He went on to earn a doctor of philosophy in 1896 and a doctor of divinity in 1902, both from Wooster College.
Following graduation, he served as a pastor in Iowa and Missouri before assuming the presidency of Parsons College in 1900. He assumed the presidency of Centre College in April 1904. Hinitt worked to increase the educational standards of Centre and pushed the state legislature to establish public high schools in every county of the state. He worked to distance the school from the Presbyterian Synod and became associated with the Carnegie Foundation for the Advancement of Teaching. In 1913, Centre built a new library funded with a $30,000 grant from Andrew Carnegie. Hinitt also pursued a plan for expansion, to include the remodeling of Breckinridge Hall, and building the Young Science Hall and Boyle-Humphrey Alumni Gymnasium. He resigned the presidency of Centre College on January 1, 1915.

Hinitt was named president of Washington & Jefferson College on September 23, 1914. He assumed the duties of the presidency on January 4, 1915, and was officially inaugurated June 15, 1915.  His tenure as president of W&J was dominated by the United States' entry into World War I. Total college enrollment dropped to 180, a decrease of 50%. The commencement of 1918 was held early to accommodate men who were deployed to Europe, but only 24 were able to attend. Hinitt's commencement sermon that year reflected this reality: "To the Class of 1918, divided on this day, with so many of your men absent in service, I have but this word to say: Fear God and serve your country!" 

He resigned the presidency of W&J on June 30, 1918 to accept the pastorate of the First Presbyterian Church of Indiana, Pennsylvania. He took a year's leave of absence to work with the YMCA in army caps in England and to serve as an army field secretary in the American Expeditionary Force.

References

See also

 Washington & Jefferson College
 President of Washington & Jefferson College

1866 births
1927 deaths
Westminster College (Missouri) alumni
McCormick Theological Seminary alumni
Presidents of Centre College
Presidents of Washington & Jefferson College
19th-century Presbyterian ministers
American Presbyterian ministers
College of Wooster alumni
People from Kidderminster
19th-century American clergy